Pittwood is an unincorporated community in Middleport Township, Iroquois County, Illinois, United States.

Geography
Pittwood is located at an elevation of 643 feet.

References

Unincorporated communities in Iroquois County, Illinois